Capayán is a department located in the south of Catamarca Province in Argentina.

Populated places

External links
Capayán webpage (Spanish)
Google Map

Departments of Catamarca Province